Hilarographa baliana is a species of moth of the family Tortricidae. It is found on Bali in Indonesia.

The wingspan is about 14 mm for males and  18 mm for females. The ground colour of the forewings is orange-brownish suffused along the edges of the lines with brown. The hindwings are dark brown with an orange median cell.

Etymology
This species is named after the island of Bali.

References

Moths described in 2009
Hilarographini